Chuviridae is a family of viruses.

Taxonomy
The family contains the following genera:

 Boscovirus
 Chuvivirus
 Culicidavirus
 Demapteravirus
 Doliuvirus
 Mivirus
 Morsusvirus
 Nigecruvirus
 Odonatavirus
 Pediavirus
 Piscichuvirus
 Pterovirus
 Scarabeuvirus
 Taceavirus

References

Virus families
Negarnaviricota